John William Hampton (6 March 1901 – 1939) was an English footballer who played in the Football League for Derby County, Preston North End and Wolverhampton Wanderers.

References

1901 births
1939 deaths
English footballers
Association football goalkeepers
English Football League players
Telford United F.C. players
Oakengates Athletic F.C. players
Wolverhampton Wanderers F.C. players
Derby County F.C. players
Preston North End F.C. players
Dundalk F.C. players